Bethel is a census-designated place (CDP) that comprises the central village of the town of Bethel, Windsor County, Vermont, United States.  As of the 2010 census, the population of the CDP was 569, compared to 2,030 for the entire town of Bethel.

Geography
Bethel is located along the Third Branch of the White River, at its confluence with the White River.  Vermont Routes 12 and 107 diverge at the village, with Route 12 heading north up the Third Branch valley towards Randolph and Route 107 heading southwest up the White River Valley towards Stockbridge.  The two routes travel east in a concurrency down the White River valley into Royalton.

References

Census-designated places in Vermont
Census-designated places in Windsor County, Vermont